Alida's Song is the sequel to The Cookcamp by Gary Paulsen. The story is about "the boy"  who receives a letter from his grandmother offering him a job as a farm hand on the farm where she cooks. It was published on June 8, 1999, by Dell Publishing.

It has been reviewed multiple times including by Publishers Weekly, School Library Journal, Booklist, Horn Book Magazine, and Kirkus Reviews.

References

Novels by Gary Paulsen
1999 American novels